Elzear Torreggiani D.D., O.S.F.C, (28 May 1830 – 28 January 1904) was a Catholic Bishop of Armidale, New South Wales.

Torregiani was born in Porto Recanati, Loreto district, Papal States, Italy and consecrated bishop on 25 March 1879. Prior to coming to Australia the bishop had had large experience of pastoral work in England and the south of Wales. He was Superior of the Capuchin Monastery in Lower Park Road, Peckham, at the date of his appointment.

See also
Catholic Church in Australia

References

1830 births
1904 deaths
19th-century Italian Roman Catholic bishops
Roman Catholic bishops of Armidale
Italian expatriates in Australia
20th-century Italian Roman Catholic bishops